The Castle River is a river in Fiordland National Park in the Southland Region of New Zealand. It rises on the slopes of Barrier Peak and flows southeast in a steep-walled valley running parallel to the Clinton Canyon before turning south. It is a tributary of Worsley Stream which empties into the Worsley Arm of Lake Te Anau.

References

Rivers of Fiordland